Jørgen Frantz Hammershaimb (6 July 1767 - 24 May 1820) was a Faroese lawyer. He was Lawman (prime minister) of the Faroe Islands from 1805 to 1816. Hammershaimb was the last Lawman before the position was abolished.

Jørgen Frantz Hammershaimb was the father of Venceslaus Ulricus Hammershaimb, who set the rules and orthography for the modern Faroese language.

References

1767 births
1820 deaths
Lawmen of the Faroe Islands